Local elections were held in Maharashtra in four phases, to select the 4,750 members of the 192 municipal councils and 20 Nagar Panchayat. Results were announced the day after each round of voting. The first phase took place on 27 November and saw the BJP emerge as the largest party in municipal councils, winning control of 53 of the 147 councils and winning 857 of the 3,417 seats. The Indian National Congress emerged as the largest party in Nagar Panchayat elections, winning 84 of the 253 seats on 18 Nagar Panchayats.

Results

Phase 1 Municipal Council Results

Phase 2 Municipal Council Results

Phase 3 Municipal Council Results

Phase 4 Municipal Council Results

Nagar Panchayat 
Despite Being Lost in State Municipal Council Election, Indian National Congress Made a Strong Comeback in Nagar Panchayat. Ruling and Winner of Municipal Council Election BJP is thrown on third Position.

Maharashtra Result Statistics 

|-
!style="background-color:#E9E9E9" align=left|Party
!style="background-color:#E9E9E9" align=right|Flag
!style="background-color:#E9E9E9" align=right|Nagar Adhyaksh
!style="background-color:#E9E9E9" align=right|Nagar Sevak
|-
|align="left" |Bharatiya Janata Party (BJP)
|align="right" valign=top |
|align="right" valign=top |73
|align="right" valign=top |1147
|-
|align="left" |Indian National Congress (INC)
|align="right" valign=top | 
|align="right" valign=top |35
|align="right" valign=top |873
|-
|align="left" |Nationalist Congress Party (NCP)
|align="right" valign=top |
|align="right" valign=top |23
|align="right" valign=top |847
|-
|align="left" |Shiv Sena (SHS)
|align="right" valign=top |
|align="right" valign=top |27
|align="right" valign=top |608
|-
|align="left" |Others
|align="right" valign=top |
|align="right" valign=top |33
|align="right" valign=top |913
|-
|}

Regionwise Breakout

Konkan 
Shivsena Become Largest Party in Konkan Region. Konkan Was Considered as Bastion of Shiv Sena. Performance of Shiv Sena here proved that. Indian National Congress Become Second Largest Party here. Ruling BJP is thrown on fourth position.

|-
!style="background-color:#E9E9E9" align=left|Party
!style="background-color:#E9E9E9" align=right|Flag
!style="background-color:#E9E9E9" align=right|Nagar Adhyaksh
!style="background-color:#E9E9E9" align=right|Nagar Sevak
|-
|align="left" |Shiv Sena (SHS)
|align="right" valign=top |
|align="right" valign=top |06
|align="right" valign=top |107
|-
|align="left" |Indian National Congress (INC)
|align="right" valign=top |
|align="right" valign=top |03
|align="right" valign=top |60
|-
|align="left" |Nationalist Congress Party (NCP)
|align="right" valign=top |
|align="right" valign=top |02
|align="right" valign=top |52
|-
|align="left" |Bharatiya Janata Party (BJP)
|align="right" valign=top |
|align="right" valign=top |03
|align="right" valign=top |47
|-
|align="left" |Others
|align="right" valign=top |
|align="right" valign=top |02
|align="right" valign=top |44
|-
|}

Pashchim Maharashtra 
Nationalist Congress Party Become Largest Party in West Maharashtra Region. Pashchim Maharashtra Was Considered as Bastion of NCP. Performance of NCP here proved that. Indian National Congress Become Second Largest Party here. Shiv Sena is thrown on fourth position.

|-
!style="background-color:#E9E9E9" align=left|Party
!style="background-color:#E9E9E9" align=right|Flag
!style="background-color:#E9E9E9" align=right|Nagar Adhyaksh
!style="background-color:#E9E9E9" align=right|Nagar Sevak
|-
|align="left" |Nationalist Congress Party (NCP)
|align="right" valign=top |
|align="right" valign=top |09
|align="right" valign=top |284
|-
|align="left" |Indian National Congress (INC)
|align="right" valign=top | 
|align="right" valign=top |07
|align="right" valign=top |213
|-
|align="left" |Bharatiya Janata Party (BJP)
|align="right" valign=top |
|align="right" valign=top |13
|align="right" valign=top |157
|-
|align="left" |Shiv Sena (SHS)
|align="right" valign=top |
|align="right" valign=top |04
|align="right" valign=top |92
|-
|align="left" |Others
|align="right" valign=top |
|align="right" valign=top |15
|align="right" valign=top |345
|-
|}

Uttar Maharashtra (Khandesh) 
BJP Become Largest Party in Khandesh Region. Khandesh Was never Considered as Bastion of Any Party. Khandesh Always gave Mixed Results. Shiv Sena Become Second Largest Party here. Nationalist Congress Party is thrown on fourth position. NCP Poor perforamce here is subject to the Arrest of NCP Mass Leader Chhagan Bhujbal in corruption charges. 

|-
!style="background-color:#E9E9E9" align=left|Party
!style="background-color:#E9E9E9" align=right|Flag
!style="background-color:#E9E9E9" align=right|Nagar Adhyaksh
!style="background-color:#E9E9E9" align=right|Nagar Sevak
|-
|align="left" |Bharatiya Janata Party (BJP)
|align="right" valign=top |
|align="right" valign=top |09
|align="right" valign=top |137
|-
|align="left" |Shiv Sena (SHS)
|align="right" valign=top |
|align="right" valign=top |07
|align="right" valign=top |122
|-
|align="left" |Indian National Congress (INC)
|align="right" valign=top | 
|align="right" valign=top |01
|align="right" valign=top |56
|-
|align="left" |Nationalist Congress Party (NCP)
|align="right" valign=top |
|align="right" valign=top |00
|align="right" valign=top |52
|-
|align="left" |Others
|align="right" valign=top |
|align="right" valign=top |04
|align="right" valign=top |155
|-
|}

Marathwada 
NCP Become Largest Party in Marathwada Region. Marathwada Was Considered as Bastion of Indian National Congress. Performance of NCP here broke the INC Bastion. Indian National Congress Become Second Largest Party here. Shivsena is thrown on fourth position.

|-
!style="background-color:#E9E9E9" align=left|Party
!style="background-color:#E9E9E9" align=right|Flag
!style="background-color:#E9E9E9" align=right|Nagar Adhyaksh
!style="background-color:#E9E9E9" align=right|Nagar Sevak
|-
|align="left" |Nationalist Congress Party (NCP)
|align="right" valign=top |
|align="right" valign=top |10
|align="right" valign=top |296
|-
|align="left" |Indian National Congress (INC)
|align="right" valign=top | 
|align="right" valign=top |17
|align="right" valign=top |294
|-
|align="left" |Bharatiya Janata Party (BJP)
|align="right" valign=top |
|align="right" valign=top |10
|align="right" valign=top |198
|-
|align="left" |Shiv Sena (SHS)
|align="right" valign=top |
|align="right" valign=top |05
|align="right" valign=top |120
|-
|align="left" |Others
|align="right" valign=top |
|align="right" valign=top |09
|align="right" valign=top |105
|-
|}

Vidarbh 
BJP Become Largest Party in Vidarbha Region. Vidarbha Was Considered as Bastion of BJP. Performance of BJP here proved that. Indian National Congress Become Second Largest Party here. Shivsena is thrown on fourth position.

|-
!style="background-color:#E9E9E9" align=left|Party
!style="background-color:#E9E9E9" align=right|Flag
!style="background-color:#E9E9E9" align=right|Nagar Adhyaksh
!style="background-color:#E9E9E9" align=right|Nagar Sevak
|-
|align="left" |Bharatiya Janata Party (BJP)
|align="right" valign=top |
|align="right" valign=top |38
|align="right" valign=top |608
|-
|align="left" |Indian National Congress (INC)
|align="right" valign=top | 
|align="right" valign=top |08
|align="right" valign=top |288
|-
|align="left" |Nationalist Congress Party (NCP)
|align="right" valign=top |
|align="right" valign=top |01
|align="right" valign=top |142
|-
|align="left" |Shiv Sena (SHS)
|align="right" valign=top |
|align="right" valign=top |05
|align="right" valign=top |138
|-
|align="left" |Others
|align="right" valign=top |
|align="right" valign=top |09
|align="right" valign=top |264
|-
|}

References 

2016 elections in India
Local elections in Maharashtra
2010s in Maharashtra
2017 elections in India